Deep water source cooling (DWSC) or deep water air cooling is a form of air cooling for process and comfort space cooling which uses a large body of naturally cold water as a heat sink. It uses water at 4 to 10 degrees Celsius drawn from deep areas within lakes, oceans, aquifers or rivers, which is pumped through the one side of a heat exchanger. On the other side of the heat exchanger, cooled water is produced.

Basic concept
Thus as water cools below 3.98 °C it decreases in density and will rise. As the temperature climbs above 3.98 °C, water density also decreases and causes the water to rise, which is why lakes are warmer on the surface during the summer. The combination of these two effects means that the bottom of most deep bodies of water located well away from the equatorial regions is at a constant 3.98 °C.

Air conditioners are heat pumps. During the summer, when outside air temperatures are higher than the temperature inside a building, air conditioners use electricity to transfer heat from the cooler interior of the building to the warmer exterior ambient. This process uses electrical energy.

Unlike residential air conditioners, most modern commercial air conditioning systems do not transfer heat directly into the exterior air. The thermodynamic efficiency of the overall system can be improved by utilizing evaporative cooling, where the temperature of the cooling water is lowered close to the wet-bulb temperature by evaporation in a cooling tower. This cooled water then acts 
as the heat sink for the heat pump.

Deep lake water cooling uses cold water pumped from the bottom of a lake as a heat sink for climate control systems. Because heat pump efficiency improves as the heat sink gets colder, deep lake water cooling can reduce the electrical demands of large cooling systems where it is available. It is similar in concept to modern geothermal sinks, but generally simpler to construct given a suitable water source.

Deep lake water cooling allows higher thermodynamic efficiency by using cold deep lake water, which is colder than the ambient wet bulb temperature. The higher efficiency results in less electricity used. For many buildings, the lake water is sufficiently cold that the refrigeration portion of the air conditioning systems can be shut down during some environmental conditions and the building interior heat can be transferred directly to the lake water heat sink. This is referred to as "free cooling", but is not actually free, since pumps and fans run to circulate the lake water and building air.

One added attraction of deep lake water cooling is that it saves energy during peak load times, such as summer afternoons, when a sizable amount of the total electrical grid load is air conditioning.

Advantages
Deep water source cooling is very energy efficient, requiring only 1/10 of the average energy required by conventional cooler systems. Consequently, its running costs can also be expected to be much lower.

The energy source is very local and fully renewable, provided that the water and heat rejected into the environment (often the same lake or a nearby river) does not disturb the natural cycles. It does not use any ozone depleting refrigerant.

Depending on the building's cooling demand, and local weather, deep water source cooling can often satisfy a complete portion of a building's cooling demand, eradicating a building's reliance on mechanical refrigeration provided through a chiller. This not only reduces the building's electrical demand (or steam demand for applications using absorption refrigeration), but also curtails dependency on evaporative cooling towers which can often times harbor the fatal bacterium Legionella pneumophila. However, building operators must adhere to, and practice correct disinfection procedures before restarting any cooling towers which remained dormant during cooler days when deep water source cooling was able to meet the building's cooling demand. 

Depending on the needs and on the water temperature, couple heating and cooling can be considered. For example, heat could first be extracted from the water (making it colder); and, secondly, that same water could cycle to a refrigerating unit to be used for even more effective cold production.

Disadvantages
Deep water source cooling requires a large and deep water quantity in the surroundings.

The set-up of a system is expensive and labour-intensive. The system also requires a great amount of source material for its construction and placement.

Although deep water source cooling is referred to as "free cooling" in some literatures, a considerable amount of energy (typically electrical) is expended to operate pumps with a sufficient head to overcome frictional, and minor losses in distribution piping, and any heat exchangers.

First major system in the United States
Cornell University's Lake Source Cooling System uses Cayuga Lake as a heat sink to operate the central chilled water system for its campus and to also provide cooling to the Ithaca City School District. The system has operated since the summer of 2000 and was built at a cost of $55–60 million. It cools a 14,500 ton (51 megawatt) load. The intake pipe of the system is 3,200 m (10,498 ft) long and has a pipe diameter of 1,600 mm (63"), installed at a depth of 229 m (750 ft), allowing access to water temperatures between 3-5 C (37-41 F). The water is returned to the lake through a 1,200 mm (47") outfall pipe, 780 m (2,560 ft) long. The pipe selected for the project was Sclairpipe, made from high density polypropylene (HDPE). Estimated savings is an 80% reduction in fossil fuel previously required to operate a conventional electric cooling system.

First system in Canada

Since August 2004, a deep lake water cooling system has been operated by the Enwave Energy Corporation in Toronto, Ontario. It draws water from Lake Ontario through tubes extending  into the lake, reaching to a depth of  where the water is maintained at a constant 4°C, its temperature protected by a layer of water above it, called a thermocline. The deep lake water cooling system is part of an integrated district cooling system that covers Toronto's financial district, and has a cooling power of 59,000 tons (207 MW). The system currently has enough capacity to cool  of office space.

The installed deep lake cooling water intake line was 1,600mm (63") in diameter, 15,000 m (49,213 ft) long and installed at a depth of 85 m (278 ft) allowing access to water temperatures of between 3-5 C (37-41 F). The selected pipe was Sclairpipe, made from high density polyethylene (HDPE) resin.

Water drawn from the depths of Lake Ontario is not circulated directly through  fan coil units installed in commercial, or residential buildings. Instead, water from the Lake is circulated through a set of closed-loop heat exchangers in order to allow for a net transfer of thermal energy from the water-glycol mixture returning from buildings to the Lake water. The water-glycol mixture is part of a closed-loop district cooling system, pumped from a centralized location where the heat-exchangers are installed, back to the buildings where it can absorb heat from fan coil units installed to provide latent, and sensible space cooling. 

The cold water drawn from Lake Ontario's deep layer in the Enwave system is not returned directly to the lake once it has been run through the heat exchange system. Instead, water is pumped to the City's water filtration plant for treatment and distribution to residential and commercial users.

The potential of deep water source cooling
The potential of integrating lakes into district systems for cooling (as well as heating) is foremost constrained by the availability of lakes. However, other factors such as the spatial distribution of cooling demand or the cost of installation and operation costs determine the techno-economic potential of lake-source district heating and cooling.

Sea water air conditioning

This version is also known as ocean water cooling. The InterContinental Resort and Thalasso-Spa on the island of Bora Bora uses a seawater air conditioning (SWAC) system to air condition its buildings. The system accomplishes this by passing cold seawater through a heat exchanger where it cools freshwater in a closed loop system. This cool freshwater is then pumped to buildings and is used for cooling directlyno conversion to electricity takes place. Similar systems are also in place in The Excelsior hotel and The Hong Kong and Shanghai Banking Corporation main building in Hong Kong, and at the Natural Energy Laboratory of Hawaii Authority. 

Salt water air conditioning systems have been used in Sydney's Circular Quay and prominent buildings within the harbour since the rise of commercial air conditioning systems in the 1960s. These include the heritage-listed AMP 'Palm Cove' Building (constructed 1962) and the Sydney Opera House. 

The InterContinental Resort is the largest seawater air conditioning system to date, though there are several other, larger systems being planned. Honolulu Seawater Air Conditioning was a project intended to use seawater air conditioning to deliver renewable cooling to commercial and residential properties in the downtown Honolulu area. On December 19, 2020, Honolulu Seawater Air Conditioning announced it was ending its development and would end operations by the end of January 2021. Honolulu Seawater Air Conditioning is majority owned by eBay founder Pierre Omidyar's Ulupono Initiative.

See also

 
 
 
 
Sea water air conditioning

Notes

References

External links
 From Lake Depths, a Blast of Cool for Consumers
 Cornell University Lake Source Cooling overview and details of how it works
 Geocean has performed the design and installation of a SWAC system for the Brando Hotel in French Polynesia.
 Makai Ocean Engineering has designed SWAC systems in Bora Bora (installed), Kona (installed) and Honolulu, Hawaii, la Reunion, Curaçao, Bahamas, and DWSC systems at Cornell University and Toronto (both installed).

Marine energy
Heating, ventilation, and air conditioning
Renewable energy